Julien Albert Marc Célestine (born 24 July 1997) is a French professional footballer who plays as a defender for Liga MX club León.

Career
Célestine began his football training at the academies of Rachais, Grenoble, Bastia, Béziers, and Toulouse before moving to Belgium with Charleroi in 2016. Célestine began his senior football career with the amateur Belgian clubs RWDM and URSL Visé. In 2020, he signed with the Latvian club Valmiera FC, and then returned to France with Rodez on 2 January 2021. Célestine made his professional debut with Rodez in a 1–1 Ligue 2 tie with Niort on 5 January 2021.

Personal life
Born in France, Célestine is of Italian descent. Célestine's brother, Enzo Célestine, is also a professional footballer.

References

External links
 
 
 

1997 births
Living people
Footballers from Paris
French footballers
French sportspeople of Italian descent
Association football defenders
Twin sportspeople
Valmieras FK players
R.W.D. Molenbeek players
Rodez AF players
Club León footballers
Ligue 2 players
Latvian Higher League players
French expatriate footballers
French expatriate sportspeople in Belgium
French expatriate sportspeople in Latvia
French expatriate sportspeople in Mexico
Expatriate footballers in Belgium
Expatriate footballers in Latvia
Expatriate footballers in Mexico